Michael Francis Moore (born April 23, 1954) is an American filmmaker, author and left-wing activist. His works frequently address the topics of globalization and capitalism.

Moore won the 2002 Academy Award for Best Documentary Feature for Bowling for Columbine, which examined the causes of the Columbine High School massacre and the overall gun culture of the United States. He also directed and produced Fahrenheit 9/11, a critical look at the presidency of George W. Bush and the War on Terror, which earned $119,194,771 to become the highest-grossing documentary at the American box office of all time. The film also won the Palme d'Or at the 2004 Cannes film festival, and was subject to intense controversy. His documentary Sicko, which examines health care in the United States, is one of the top ten highest-grossing documentaries . In September 2008, he released his first free movie on the internet, Slacker Uprising, which documented his personal quest to encourage more Americans to vote in presidential elections. He has also written and starred in the TV shows TV Nation, a satirical news-magazine television series, and The Awful Truth, a satirical show. In 2018, he released his latest film, Fahrenheit 11/9, a documentary about the 2016 United States presidential election and the subsequent presidency of Donald Trump. He was executive producer of Planet of the Humans (2019), a documentary about the environmental movement.

Moore's works criticize topics such as globalization, large corporations, assault weapon ownership, Presidents Bill Clinton, George W. Bush and Donald Trump, the Iraq War, the American health care system and capitalism overall. In 2005, Time named Moore one of the world's 100 most influential people. Critics have labeled Moore himself as a propagandist, and his films as propaganda.

Early life
Michael Francis Moore was born outside Flint, Michigan, and raised in Davison by parents Helene Veronica (née Wall) (1921–2002), a secretary, and Francis Richard "Frank" Moore, (1921–2014) an automotive assembly-line worker. At that time, the city of Flint was home to many General Motors factories, where his parents and grandfather worked. His uncle LaVerne was one of the founders of the United Automobile Workers labor union and participated in the Flint sit-down strike.

Moore was brought up in a traditional Catholic home, and has Irish, and smaller amounts of Scottish and English, ancestry. Some of his ancestors were Quakers. He attended parochial St. John's Elementary School for primary school and later attended St. Paul's Seminary in Saginaw, Michigan, for a year. He then attended Davison High School, where he was active in both drama and debate, graduating in 1972. As a member of the Boy Scouts of America, he achieved the rank of Eagle Scout. At the age of 18, he was elected to the Davison school board. At the time he was the youngest person elected to office in the U.S., as the minimum age to hold public office had just been lowered to 18.

Career

Journalism
Moore dropped out of the University of Michigan–Flint following his first year of school (where he wrote for the student newspaper The Michigan Times). At 22 he founded the alternative weekly magazine The Flint Voice, which soon changed its name to The Michigan Voice as it expanded to cover the entire state. Popstar Harry Chapin is credited with being the reason the magazine was able to start by performing benefit concerts and donating the money to Moore. Moore crept backstage after a concert to Chapin's dressing room and convinced him to do a concert and give the money to him. Chapin subsequently did a concert in Flint every year.
In 1986, when Moore became the editor of Mother Jones, a liberal political magazine, The Michigan Voice was shut down by the investors and he moved to California.

After four months at Mother Jones, Moore was fired. Matt Labash of The Weekly Standard reported this was for refusing to print an article by Paul Berman that was critical of the Sandinista human rights record in Nicaragua. Moore refused to run the article, believing it to be inaccurate. "The article was flatly wrong and the worst kind of patronizing bullshit. You would scarcely know from it that the United States had been at war with Nicaragua for the last five years."

Moore believes that Mother Jones fired him because of the publisher's refusal to allow him to cover a story on the GM plant closings in his hometown of Flint, Michigan. He responded by putting laid-off GM worker Ben Hamper (who was also writing for the same magazine at the time) on the magazine's cover, leading to his termination. Moore sued for wrongful dismissal, and settled out of court for $58,000, providing him with seed money for his first film, Roger & Me.

Directing, producing and screenwriting

Roger & Me
The 1989 film Roger & Me was Moore's first documentary about what happened to Flint, Michigan, after General Motors closed its factories and opened new ones in Mexico where the workers were paid lower wages. The "Roger" is Roger B. Smith, former CEO and President of General Motors. Harlan Jacobson, editor of Film Comment magazine, said that Moore muddled the chronology in Roger & Me to make it seem that events that took place before G.M.'s layoffs were a consequence of them. Critic Roger Ebert defended Moore's handling of the timeline as an artistic and stylistic choice that had less to do with his credibility as a filmmaker and more to do with the flexibility of film as a medium to express a satiric viewpoint.

Pets or Meat: The Return to Flint
Moore made a follow-up 23-minute documentary film, Pets or Meat: The Return to Flint, that aired on PBS in 1992. It is based on Roger & Me. The film's title refers to Rhonda Britton, a Flint, Michigan resident featured in both the 1989 and 1992 films, who sells rabbits as either pets or meat.

Canadian Bacon
Moore's 1995 satirical film Canadian Bacon features a fictional U.S. president (played by Alan Alda) engineering a fake war with Canada in order to boost his popularity. The film is also one of the last featuring Canadian actor John Candy. Some commentators in the media felt the film was influenced by the Stanley Kubrick film Dr. Strangelove.

The Big One
Moore's 1997 film The Big One documents the tour publicizing Moore's book Downsize This! Random Threats from an Unarmed American, in which he criticizes mass layoffs despite record corporate profits. Among others, he targets Nike for outsourcing shoe production to Indonesia.

Bowling for Columbine
His documentary Bowling for Columbine, released in 2002, probes the culture of guns and violence in the United States, taking as a starting point the Columbine High School massacre of 1999. Bowling for Columbine won the Anniversary Prize at the 2002 Cannes Film Festival and France's César Award as the Best Foreign Film. In the United States, it won the 2002 Academy Award for Documentary Feature. It also enjoyed great commercial and critical success for a film of its type, and has since gone on to be considered one of the greatest documentary films of all-time. At the time of Columbines release, it was the highest-grossing mainstream-released documentary (a record now held by Moore's Fahrenheit 9/11).

Fahrenheit 9/11
Moore's film, Fahrenheit 9/11, released in 2004, examines America in the aftermath of the September 11 attacks, particularly the record of the George W. Bush Administration and alleged links between the families of George W. Bush and Osama bin Laden. Fahrenheit was awarded the Palme d'Or, the top honor at the 2004 Cannes Film Festival; it was the first documentary film to win the prize since 1956. Moore later announced that Fahrenheit 9/11 would not be in consideration for the 2005 Academy Award for Documentary Feature, but instead for the Academy Award for Best Picture. He stated he wanted the movie to be seen by a few million more people via television broadcast prior to Election Day. According to Moore, "Academy rules forbid the airing of a documentary on television within nine months of its theatrical release", and since the November 2 election was fewer than nine months after the film's release, it would have been disqualified for the Documentary Oscar. Regardless, Fahrenheit did not receive an Oscar nomination for Best Picture. The pre-release subtitle of the film confirms the allusion: "The temperature at which freedom burns."

As of August 2012, Fahrenheit 9/11 is the highest-grossing documentary of all time, taking in over US$200 million worldwide, including United States box office revenue of almost US$120 million. In February 2011, Moore sued producers Bob and Harvey Weinstein for US$2.7 million in unpaid profits from the film, claiming they used "Hollywood accounting tricks" to avoid paying him the money. In February 2012, Moore and the Weinsteins informed the court that they had settled their dispute.

Sicko

Moore directed the 2007 film, Sicko, about the American health care system, focusing particularly on the managed-care and pharmaceutical industries. At least four major pharmaceutical companies—Pfizer, Eli Lilly, AstraZeneca, and GlaxoSmithKline—ordered their employees not to grant any interviews or assist Moore. According to Moore in a letter on his website, "roads that often surprise us and lead us to new ideas—and challenge us to reconsider the ones we began with have caused some minor delays." The film premiered at the Cannes Film Festival on May 19, 2007, receiving a lengthy standing ovation, and was released in the U.S. and Canada on June 29, 2007. The film is currently ranked the twelfth highest grossing documentary of all time and received an Academy Award nomination for Best Documentary Feature.

Captain Mike Across America and Slacker Uprising
Moore takes a look at the politics of college students in what he calls "Bush Administration America" with Captain Mike Across America, which was shot during Moore's 62-city college campus tour in the months leading up to the 2004 presidential election. The film debuted at the Toronto International Film Festival on September 7, 2007. It was later re-edited by Moore into Slacker Uprising and released for free on the internet on September 23, 2008.

Capitalism: A Love Story
Released on September 23, 2009, Capitalism: A Love Story looks at the financial crisis of 2007–2008 and the U.S. economy during the transition between the outgoing Bush Administration and the incoming Obama Administration.  Addressing a press conference at its release, Moore said, "Democracy is not a spectator sport, it's a participatory event. If we don't participate in it, it ceases to be a democracy. So Obama will rise or fall based not so much on what he does but on what we do to support him."

Where to Invade Next
Where to Invade Next examines the benefits of progressive social policies in various countries. The film had its premiere at the 2015 Toronto International Film Festival. Godfrey Cheshire, writing for Roger Ebert.com, wrote that "Moore's surprising and extraordinarily winning Where to Invade Next will almost surely cast his detractors at Fox News and similar sinkholes into consternation".

Michael Moore in TrumpLand
In Michael Moore in TrumpLand, Moore talks about the 2016 Presidential Election Campaigns. It is a solo performance showing Moore on stage speaking to a seated audience. The film consists of Moore's opinions of the candidates and highlights the Democratic National Candidate Hillary Clinton's strengths and also features a lengthy section on how the Republican National Candidate Donald Trump could win. It was filmed in Wilmington, Ohio, at the Murphy Theatre over the course of two nights in October 2016. The film premiered just eleven days after it was shot at the IFC Center in New York City.

Fahrenheit 11/9
In May 2017, it was announced that Moore had reunited with Harvey Weinstein to direct his new film about Donald Trump, titled Fahrenheit 11/9, which was released in approximately 1,500 theaters in the United States and Canada on September 21, 2018. Sexual assault allegations against Weinstein prompted Moore to revoke the plan to work with The Weinstein Company, which stalled production. The title refers to the day when Donald Trump officially became President-elect of the United States. In a column for Variety responding to the film's low opening weekend, "How Michael Moore Lost His Audience", sympathetic film critic Owen Gleiberman wrote "He's like an aging rock star putting out albums that simply don't mean as much to those who were, and are, his core fans". According to Glenn Greenwald, "what he’s trying is of unparalleled importance: not to take the cheap route of exclusively denouncing Trump but to take the more complicated, challenging, and productive route of understanding who and what created the climate in which Trump could thrive."

Planet of the Humans

Michael Moore was executive producer of the documentary, Planet of the Humans, which was directed by Jeff Gibbs and released on July 31, 2019. The film makes the argument that since the first Earth Day, the condition of the planet has worsened, and questions whether mainstream approaches adopted by industry to mitigate climate change entail environmental impacts whose costs are comparable to or even possibly outweigh the benefits. The film received criticism from a number of climate change experts and activists who disputed its claims and the accuracy of figures cited in the film and suggested that the film could play into the hands of the fossil fuel industry.

Michael Moore, Jeff Gibbs, and co-producer Ozzie Zehner responded to the critics on an episode of Rising.

Writing

Moore has written and co-written eight non-fiction books, mostly on similar subject matter to his documentaries. Stupid White Men (2001) is ostensibly a critique of American domestic and foreign policy but, by Moore's own admission, is also "a book of political humor". Dude, Where's My Country? (2003), is an examination of the Bush family’s relationships with Saudi royalty, the Bin Laden family, and the energy industry, and a call-to-action for liberals in the 2004 election. Several of his works have made bestseller lists.

Acting
Moore has dabbled in acting, following a supporting role in Lucky Numbers (2000) playing the cousin of Lisa Kudrow's character, who agrees to be part of the scheme concocted by John Travolta's character. He also had a cameo in his Canadian Bacon as an anti-Canada activist. In 1999, he did a cameo in EDtv as one of the panel members. In 2004, he did a cameo, as a news journalist, in The Fever, starring Vanessa Redgrave in the lead.

Television
Between 1994 and 1995, he directed and hosted the BBC television series TV Nation, which followed the format of news magazine shows but covered topics they avoid. The series aired on BBC2 in the UK. The series was also aired in the US on NBC in 1994 for 9 episodes and again for 8 episodes on Fox in 1995.

His other major series was The Awful Truth, which satirized actions by big corporations and politicians. It aired on the UK's Channel 4, and the Bravo network in the US, in 1999 and 2000. Moore won the Hugh M. Hefner First Amendment Award in Arts and Entertainment for being the executive producer and host of The Awful Truth, where he was also described as "muckraker, author and documentary filmmaker".

Another 1999 series, Michael Moore Live, was aired in the UK only on Channel 4, though it was broadcast from New York. This show had a similar format to The Awful Truth, but also incorporated phone-ins and a live stunt each week.

In 2017, Moore planned to return to prime time network television on Turner/TNT in late 2017 or early 2018 with a program called "Michael Moore Live from the Apocalypse". In February 2019, however, the network announced the show would not be produced.

Music videos

Moore has directed several music videos, including two for Rage Against the Machine for songs from The Battle of Los Angeles: "Sleep Now in the Fire" and "Testify". He was threatened with arrest during the shooting of "Sleep Now in the Fire", which was filmed on Wall Street; and subsequently the city of New York City denied the band permission to play there, even though the band and Moore had secured a federal permit to perform.

Moore also directed the videos for R.E.M. single "All the Way to Reno (You're Gonna Be a Star)" in 2001 and the System of a Down song "Boom!".

Appearances in other documentaries
 He appeared in The Drugging of Our Children, a 2005 documentary about over-prescription of psychiatric medication to children and teenagers, directed by Gary Null, a proponent of alternative medicine. In the film Moore agrees with Gary Null that Ritalin and other similar drugs are over-prescribed, saying that they are seen as a "pacifier".
 He appeared on fellow Flint natives Grand Funk Railroad's episode of Behind the Music.
 He appeared as an off-camera interviewer in Blood in the Face, a 1991 documentary about white supremacy groups. At the center of the film is a neo-Nazi gathering in Michigan.
 Moore appeared in the 2001 documovie The Party's Over discussing Democrats and Republicans.
 He appeared in The Yes Men, a 2003 documentary about two men who pose as the World Trade Organization. He appears during a segment concerning working conditions in Mexico and Latin America.
 Moore was interviewed for the 2004 documentary, The Corporation. One of his highlighted quotes was: "The problem is the profit motive: for corporations, there's no such thing as enough."
 He appeared in the 2006 documentary I'm Going to Tell You a Secret, which chronicles Madonna's 2004 Re-Invention World Tour. Moore attended her show in New York City at Madison Square Garden.
 He appeared briefly in the 2016 documentary Cameraperson, directed by Kirsten Johnson, who was one of his camera operators in Fahrenheit 9/11

Theater
Moore's Broadway debut, The Terms of My Surrender, an anti-Trump dramatic monologue, premiered on August 10, 2017 at the Belasco Theatre. Donald Trump tweeted his dislike for the show and falsely claimed that it closed early. In the first week the production earned $456,195 in sales and $367,634 in the final week, altogether grossing $4.2 million, falling short of its potential gross. It lasted 13 weeks with 96 performances until October 2017, grossing 49% of its potential. Fox News gave it a negative review, in line with Trump's comments. The show was unenthusiastically praised by The Guardian, which said he only wanted to "preach to the choir". A spokesman for "The Terms of My Surrender" suggested that the production might have a in San Francisco in early 2018, which didn’t materialize.

Honorary degree
He was awarded the Honorary Degree of Doctor of Humanities from Michigan State University in Fall 2014.

Political views

Although Moore has been known for his political activism, he rejects the label as redundant in a democracy: "I and you and everyone else has to be a political activist. If we're not politically active, it ceases to be a democracy." According to John Flesher of the Associated Press, Moore is known for his "fiery left-wing populism", and publications such as the Socialist Worker Online have hailed him as the "new Tom Paine". In a speech, he said that socialism is democracy and Christianity. However, he later said that economic philosophies from the past were not apt enough to describe today's realities.

Moore was a high-profile guest at both the 2004 Democratic National Convention and the 2004 Republican National Convention, chronicling his impressions in USA Today. He was criticized in a speech by Republican Senator John McCain as "a disingenuous film-maker". Moore laughed and waved as Republican attendees jeered, later chanting "four more years". Moore gestured an L with his index finger and thumb at the crowd, which translates into "loser".

During September and October 2004, Moore spoke at universities and colleges in swing states during his "Slacker Uprising Tour". The tour gave away ramen and underwear to students who promised to vote. One stop during the tour was Utah Valley State College. A fight for his right to speak resulted in massive public debates and a media blitz, eventually resulting in a lawsuit against the college and the resignation of at least one member of the college's student government. The Utah event was chronicled in the documentary film This Divided State.

Moore urged Ralph Nader not to run in 2004 so as not to split the left vote. On Real Time with Bill Maher, Moore and Bill Maher knelt before Nader to plead with him to stay out of the race.

Moore drew attention in 2004 when he used the term "deserter" to describe then president George W. Bush while introducing Retired Army Gen. Wesley K. Clark at a Democratic presidential debate in New Hampshire. Noting that Clark had been a champion debater at West Point, Moore told a laughing crowd, "I know what you're thinking. I want to see that debate" between Clark and Bush – "the general versus the deserter". Moore said he was referring to published reports in several media outlets including The Boston Globe which had reported that "there is strong evidence that Bush performed no military service as required when he moved from Houston to Alabama to work on a U.S. Senate campaign from May to November 1972."

In 2007, Moore became a contributing journalist at OpEdNews, and by May 2014, had authored over 70 articles published on their website. Moore was an active supporter of the Occupy Wall Street protest in New York City and spoke with the OWS protesters on September 26, 2011. On October 29, 2011, he spoke at the Occupy Oakland protest site to express his support.

Moore praised Django Unchained, tweeting that the movie "is one of the best film satires ever. A rare American movie on slavery and the origins of our sick racist history."

Moore's 2011 claims that "Four hundred obscenely wealthy individuals, 400 little Mubaraks – most of whom benefited in some way from the multi-trillion-dollar taxpayer bailout of 2008 – now have more cash, stock and property than the assets of 155 million Americans combined" and that these 400 Americans "have more wealth than half of all Americans combined" was found to be true by PolitiFact and others.

After Venezuelan President Hugo Chávez died in March 2013, Moore praised him for "eliminating 75 percent of extreme poverty" while "[providing] free health and education for all".

2000 presidential election 
Moore supported Ralph Nader in the 2000 presidential election. Moore was critical of Al Gore and George W. Bush. Moore criticizes Gore for the loss of thousands of jobs during his time as Vice president, voting to confirm Antonin Scalia, proposing more funding for the pentagon, and proposing to expand the War on drugs. Moore reportedly told Bush “Your possible victory on Tuesday is a threat to our national security". Moore also called Bush “a banal, despicable, and corrupt human being".

Barack Obama 
On April 21, 2008, Moore endorsed Barack Obama for president, stating that Hillary Clinton's recent actions had been "disgusting". Moore criticized the 2011 military intervention in Libya. After the US troops launched 110 Tomahawk missiles at military targets in Libya, Moore suggested that President Barack Obama should return his Nobel Peace Prize and tweeted in his official Twitter account, "May I suggest a 50-mile evacuation zone around Obama's Nobel Peace Prize?"

In an op-ed piece for The New York Times published on December 31, 2013, Moore assessed the Affordable Care Act, calling it "awful" and adding that "Obamacare's rocky start ... is a result of one fatal flaw: The Affordable Care Act is a pro-insurance-industry plan implemented by a president who knew in his heart that a single-payer, Medicare-for-all model was the true way to go." Despite his strong critique, however, Moore wrote that he still considers the plan a "godsend" because it provides a start "to get what we deserve: universal quality health care."

2016 Presidential election 
In December 2015, Moore announced his support for Vermont Senator Bernie Sanders in the 2016 United States presidential election. Moore called Sanders a "force to contend with". In January 2016, he officially endorsed Bernie Sanders for president. He also described democratic socialism as "a true democracy where everyone has a seat at the table, everyone has a voice, not just the rich". After Sanders lost the 2016 primaries, Moore urged Americans to vote for Clinton while also correctly predicting that Trump would win the election because the post-industrial Midwestern states would vote for Trump. After Trump was elected, Moore called Trump a "Russian traitor", saying his presidency had "no legitimacy".

In October 2016, Moore criticized Julian Assange and WikiLeaks for publishing leaks from the DNC's emails, saying: "I think WikiLeaks and I think Assange, they're essentially anarchists and they know, just like a lot of people voting for Trump know, that he's their human Molotov cocktail and they want to blow up the system. It's an anarchic move."

In November 2016, right after Donald Trump was elected President of the United States, and inspired by Bertram Gross's 1980 book, Friendly Fascism, Moore reportedly stated: "The next wave of fascists will not come with cattle cars and concentration camps, but they'll come with a smiley face and maybe a TV show ... That's how the 21st-century fascists will essentially take over." On November 12, 2016, Moore participated in a NYC anti-Trump rally which was later (in 2018) alleged to have been organized by Russians who were indicted by Robert Mueller for meddling in the 2016 election.

Donald Trump 

Moore started the website TrumpiLeaks in May 2017, to encourage whistleblowers to provide information about Donald Trump. Moore was inspired to create the site after witnessing the firings by Trump of three law enforcement officials, specifically: United States Attorney Preet Bharara, former acting United States Attorney General Sally Yates, and former Director of the Federal Bureau of Investigation James Comey. Moore posted a message to his personal website, explaining the motivation of the new venture and that he wanted any information related to: "crimes, breaches of public trust and misconduct committed by Donald J. Trump and his associates". He asserted, "Trump thinks he's above the law". Moore stated it was his view that Trump had engaged in obstruction of justice, falsehoods to the United States citizenry, promoted violent behavior, and violated the Constitution of the United States.

In March 2018, Moore criticized the "corporate media", saying "You turn on the TV, and it's 'Russia, Russia, Russia!' These are all shiny keys to distract us. We should know about the West Virginia strike. What an inspiration that would be. But they don't show this".

In April 2018, Moore taunted Trump by ironically asking him why he had not already fired Robert Mueller. After the Russia–United States summit of July 2018, Moore called for Trump’s impeachment, saying "Congress needs no more proof than Trump's admission yesterday that he sides with Putin to impeach and remove him."

Moore compared Trump to Nazi Germany's dictator Adolf Hitler. On August 10, 2019, Moore tweeted: "I guess they think a country dumb enough to elect Trump is stupid enough to believe Jeffrey Epstein committed suicide."

In October 2019, he announced his political endorsement of Bernie Sanders in the 2020 Democratic Party presidential primaries. After Sanders lost the primaries, Moore urged Sanders supporters to vote for Joe Biden in the general election.

Personal life
Moore married film producer Kathleen Glynn on October 19, 1991. He filed for divorce on June 17, 2013. On July 22, 2014, the divorce was finalized.

Moore was raised a Catholic but disagrees with traditional church teaching on subjects such as abortion and same-sex marriage. In an interview with The A.V. Club, when asked if there was a God, he stated, "Yes, there is. I don't know how you define that, but yeah."

Following the Columbine High School massacre, Moore acquired a lifetime membership to the National Rifle Association (NRA). Moore said that he initially intended to become the NRA's president to dismantle the organization, but he soon dismissed the plan as too difficult. Gun rights supporters such as Dave Kopel said there was no chance of that happening; David T. Hardy and Jason Clarke wrote that Moore failed to discover that the NRA selects a president not by membership vote but by a vote of the board of directors.

In 2005, Time named Moore one of the world's 100 most influential people. Later in 2005, Moore founded the Traverse City Film Festival held annually in Traverse City, Michigan. In 2009, he co-founded the Traverse City Comedy Festival, also held annually in Traverse City, where Moore helped to spearhead the renovation of the historic downtown State Theater.

Work

Filmography

Bibliography
 
 
 
 
 
 
 
 
 2012 (Audible: 2011): Here Comes Trouble: Stories from My Life (audiobook, read by Michael Moore), Grand Central Publishing,

Video shorts
 Rage Against the Machine: Sleep Now in the Fire (2000)
 Rage Against the Machine: Testify (2000)
 R.E.M.: All the Way to Reno (You're Gonna Be a Star) (2001)
 In View: The Best of R.E.M. 1988–2003 (2003)
 System of a Down: Boom! (2003)

Television series
 TV Nation (1994)
 The Awful Truth (1999)
 Michael Moore Live (1999)

Podcasting
 RUMBLE with Michael Moore (2019–present)

References

Further reading
 Benson, Thomas W., and Snee, Brian J. (eds.): Michael Moore and the Rhetoric of Documentary. Carbondale: Southern Illinois University Press, 2015. .

External links

 
 Michael Moore at The Huffington Post
 
 
 
 Rumble with Michael Moore

 
1954 births
Living people
20th-century American male writers
20th-century American non-fiction writers
21st-century American male writers
21st-century American non-fiction writers
Activists from Michigan
American anti-capitalists
American alternative journalists
American anti–Iraq War activists
American autobiographers
American documentary filmmakers
American health activists
American male film actors
American male non-fiction writers
American podcasters
American music video directors
American people of Canadian descent
American people of English descent
American people of Irish descent
American people of Scottish descent
American political activists
American political commentators
American political writers
American social commentators
American socialists
Anti-consumerists
Anti-corporate activists
Anti-globalization activists
Articles containing video clips
Catholic socialists
César Award winners
Directors of Best Documentary Feature Academy Award winners
Directors of Palme d'Or winners
Emmy Award winners
Film directors from Michigan
Former Roman Catholics
HuffPost writers and columnists
Male actors from Michigan
Members of the Democratic Socialists of America
Michigan socialists
Michigan Democrats
American opinion journalists
People from Davison, Michigan
People from Traverse City, Michigan
School board members in Michigan
Theatre owners
University of Michigan–Flint alumni
Writers from Flint, Michigan
Writers Guild of America Award winners
Postmodernist filmmakers